, also known as  or , is a lake on the border between Norway and Sweden. The Norwegian side lies in Hattfjelldal Municipality in Nordland county (and it is inside Børgefjell National Park). The Swedish side of the lake is called Bije-Ransaren, which means "the upper Ransaren" and this part lies in Vilhelmina Municipality in Västerbotten County.

The brook that flows from the lake on the east side is called Saxån.  It leads to the larger lake, Ransarn, which is located in Vilhelmina Municipality in Sweden. Bije-Ransaren is called the upper Ransarn in contrast to the bigger lake, which is referred to as "lower" Ransarn.

See also
 List of lakes in Norway
 Geography of Norway

References

Lakes of Nordland
Hattfjelldal
Norway–Sweden border
International lakes of Europe
Lakes of Västerbotten County